Tremarctos floridanus, occasionally called the Florida spectacled bear, Florida cave bear, or rarely Florida short-faced bear, is an extinct species of bear in the family Ursidae, subfamily Tremarctinae. T. floridanus was widespread in the southeastern United States during the Rancholabrean epoch (250,000–11,000 years ago), with scattered reports of fossils from other parts of North America and from earlier epochs.

Environment
T. floridanus was widely distributed south of the continental ice sheet, along the Gulf Coast through Florida, north to Tennessee and South Carolina during the Rancholabrean epoch (250,000–11,000 years ago). A few fossil specimens have been reported from the Irvingtonian (2.5 million–250,000 years ago) and Blancan (4.75–1.8 million years ago) epochs in western North America. Fossils of T. floridanus have been reported from two sites in Belize.

Arctodus (3 million–11,000 years ago) was a contemporary and shared its habitat with T. floridanus. The closest living relative of the Florida cave bear is the spectacled bear of South America; they are classified together with the huge short-faced bears in the subfamily Tremarctinae. They became extinct at the end of the last ice age, 10,000 years ago (possibly as late as 8,000 years ago at Devil's Den in Florida), due to some combination of climate change and hunting by newly arrived Paleo-Indians.

Taxonomy
Originally, Gidley named this animal Arctodus floridanus in 1928. It was recombined as T. floridanus by Kurten (1963), Lundelius (1972) and Kurten and Anderson (1980). The type specimen was found in the Golf Course site of the Melbourne Bone Bed in Melbourne, Florida.

Fossil distribution
Sites:
Anza-Borrego, California (Irvingtonian epoch)
Aucilla River in Jefferson County, Florida
Cebada Cave, Belize
Cutler Fossil Site, Miami-Dade County, Florida
Devil's Den Cave, Marion County, Florida
Edisto Beach, South Carolina (Rancholabrean epoch)
El Golfo, Sonora (Irvingtonian epoch)
Extinction Cave, Belize
Haile Quarry site, Alachua County, Florida
Harleyville, South Carolina (Rancholabrean epoch)
Ingleside, Texas
Myrtle Beach, South Carolina (Rancholabrean epoch)
Rock Spring, Orange County, Florida
Runnymede Plantation, South Carolina ("Tremarctos sp.")
San Simon, Arizona ("Tremarctos sp.", late Blancan epoch)
Other sites in Florida, including in Alachua, Brevard, Citrus, Columbia, DeSoto, Duval, Indian River, Lake, Levy, Marion, Miami-Dade, Nassau, Pinellas, St. Johns, Taylor and Volusia counties.

References

Pliocene bears
Pleistocene bears
Pleistocene mammals of North America
Pleistocene extinctions
Prehistoric mammals of North America
Fossil taxa described in 1928